EFD may refer to:

 EFD (eFunds Corporation), an American payments service company
 EF Education First–Drapac p/b Cannondale, an American professional cycling team
 Electro-fluid-dynamics
 Electrofluidic display technology
 Ellington Field, an airport in Texas
 Enterprise flash drive
 Entertainment Film Distributors, a British distributor of independent films
 Europe of Freedom and Democracy, a political group in the European Parliament
 European Foundation for Democracy
 Federal Department of Finance, of Switzerland
 Elite Football Women (Elitfotboll Dam)
 Enterprise function diagrams, in functional software architecture
 Executive Function Disorder, alternative nomenclature for ADD/ADHD